The Small Holdings Act 1892 (55 & 56 Vict. c. 31) was an Act of the Parliament of the United Kingdom passed by Lord Salisbury's Conservative government.

The Act intended to help agricultural labourers purchase small holdings of land by giving County Councils the power to advance money to the labourer up to the limit of one penny in the pound of the county rate. A small holding was described as a plot of land larger than an acre but not more than 50 acres. If land over 50 acres was worth less than £50 a year in value it was considered a small holding. In a speech in Exeter Lord Salisbury confessed he did not believe that small holdings were the most efficient use of land but added that there were "things more important than economy": "I believe a small proprietary is the strongest bulwark against revolutionary change". The Liberal leader William Ewart Gladstone supported the Bill but wished it had granted councils the power to compulsory purchase land for small holdings. Joseph Chamberlain defended the absence of compulsory purchase powers by saying that there was insufficient evidence of the success of small-hold farming to warrant compulsion.

Two future Liberal Party MPs, Richard Winfrey and Clement Edwards, complained that the Act was "an absolute failure owing to its operation being purely permissive". Few local authorities made use of the Act.

Notes

United Kingdom Acts of Parliament 1892
Agriculture legislation in the United Kingdom